Williams Peak is a 7,431-foot (2,265 meter) mountain summit located at the western edge of the Saint Elias Mountains, in the U.S. state of Alaska. Precipitation runoff from the mountain drains into tributaries of the Nizina River, which in turn is part of the Copper River drainage basin.

Climate

Based on the Köppen climate classification, Williams Peak is located in a subarctic climate zone with long, cold, snowy winters, and cool summers. Winds coming off the Gulf of Alaska are forced upwards by the Saint Elias Mountains (orographic lift), causing heavy precipitation in the form of rainfall and snowfall. Temperatures can drop below −20 °C with wind chill factors below −30 °C. The months May through June offer the most favorable weather for viewing and climbing.

See also

List of mountain peaks of Alaska
Geography of Alaska
Kennecott, Alaska

References

External links

 Williams Peak Flickr photo
 Weather forecast: Williams Peak

Mountains of Alaska
Landforms of Copper River Census Area, Alaska
Wrangell–St. Elias National Park and Preserve
Saint Elias Mountains
North American 2000 m summits